Paulo Pereira may refer to:

 Paulo Pereira (footballer) (born 1965), Brazilian football defender
 Paulo Pereira de Almeida (fl. 2005–2010), Portuguese academic
 Paulo Pereira (handballer) (fl. 2020), Portuguese handball coach

See also
 Paulo Silas (born 1965), full name Paulo Silas do Prado Pereira, Brazilian football manager and former midfielder
 Paulo Vitor (footballer, born 1999), Paulo Vitor Fernandes Pereira, Brazilian football winger
 Paula Pereira (disambiguation)
 Pablo Pereira (disambiguation)